

Events

January events 
 January 13 – The 1982 Washington Metro train derailment involves an Orange Line train in Downtown Washington, D.C. in the United States and kills three people.
 January 26 – The Palace on Wheels luxury train begins to run on Indian Railways.
 January 27 – The Bouhalouane train crash in Algeria kills 131 people.

March events 
 March – The Tōhoku Shinkansen line in Japan opens between Omiya (near Tokyo) and Morioka.

April events 
 April 1 – A major railroad line service in New Zealand, officially operation transferred to New Zealand Railways Corporation from New Zealand Railways Department.   
 April 6 – Opening of the Wells and Walsingham Light Railway in Norfolk, England, at  probably the longest public  gauge miniature railway in the world.

May events 
The last freight trains passed over the Dumbarton Cut-off.

June events 
 June 25 – Opening of the Furka (Base) Tunnel on the metre gauge Furka Oberalp Bahn in Switzerland between Oberwald and Realp.

July events 
 July 28 – Fire destroys the Harrisonburg, Virginia, offices of the former Chesapeake Western Railway, which had been merged into the Norfolk and Western Railway in 1954.

August events 
 August 2 – Helsinki Metro opens in Finland, the World's most northern metro.

September events 
 September 18 – The second stage of Brisbane, Australia, Suburban Electrification is commissioned between Bowen Hills and Shorncliffe, and also between Roma Street and Kingston.
 September 19 – Final day of PCC streetcar operation in San Francisco before all routes began full time Muni Metro light rail services through the Market Street Subway.
 September 21 – Takabata Station in Nakagawa-ku, Nagoya, Aichi Prefecture, Japan, is opened.

October events
 October 23 – The first of 46 new 85-foot stainless steel electric multiple unit cars (1-46) built by Nippon-Sharyo of Nagoya, Japan are placed in service on the South Shore Commuter Line by the Northern Indiana Commuter Transportation District. These cars replaced Insull-era equipment dating back to 1926.

November events 
 November 15 – The Joetsu Shinkansen opens for service between Ōmiya and Niigata, Japan.

December events 
 December 29 – The Seaboard Coast Line Railroad and the Louisville and Nashville Railroad merge to form the Seaboard System Railroad.

Unknown date events
 Robert Krebs succeeds Alan Furth as president of the Southern Pacific Company, the parent company of the Southern Pacific Railroad.

Accidents

Births

Deaths

References